Daljit Singh Dosanjh known professionally as Diljit Dosanjh (born 6 January 1984) is an Indian singer, actor, film producer and television personality. He works in Punjabi Music and subsequently in Punjabi and Hindi cinema. Dosanjh entered Social 50 chart by Billboard in 2020. He is featured in various music charts including Canadian Albums Chart,  UK Asian chart by Official Charts Company  and New Zealand Hot Singles. His movies, including Jatt & Juliet 2, Punjab 1984, Sajjan Singh Rangroot and Honsla Rakh are among the highest grossing Punjabi films in history.

Hailing from Dosanjh Kalan, Jalandhar, Dosanjh started in 2002 and gained recognition in punjabi music with his album ‘Smile’(2005) and ‘Chocolate’(2008) followed by ‘The Next Level’(2009) with Yo Yo Honey Singh. Subsequently he pursued his acting, starring in debut punjabi movie The Lion of Punjab in 2011. 

He made his Bollywood debut in 2016 with the crime thriller Udta Punjab for which he earned the Filmfare Award for Best Male Debut, in addition for a nomination for the Filmfare Award for Best Supporting Actor. This was followed by Good Newwz (2019), for which he received his second nomination for the Filmfare Award for Best Supporting Actor. As of 2020, he has won the most five PTC Award for Best Actor. He has also appeared as a judge in three seasons of the reality show Rising Star. In 2020, Dosanjh entered Social 50 chart by Billboard, following the release of his 11th album G.O.A.T.. The album, along with his next one MoonChild Era were listed in the Billboard Canadian Albums Chart.

Early life
Diljit Dosanjh was born on 6 January 1984 to a Sikh family in the village of Dosanjh Kalan in Phillaur tehsil, Jalandhar district, Punjab, India. His father, Balbir Singh, is a former employee of Punjab Roadways and his mother, Sukhwinder Kaur, is a homemaker. He has two siblings, one elder sister and one younger brother. He spent his early childhood in Dosanjh Kalan and then moved to Ludhiana, Punjab from where he completed his formal education, including graduating high school from Shri Guru Harkrishan Public School. While still in school, he began his singing career by performing Kirtan (Sikh religious music) at local gurdwaras. Diljit Singh and his family then moved to Ludhiana and currently living there.

Career

2003–2004: Ishq Da Uda Ada and Dil
Diljit released his first album Ishq Da Uda Ada in 2004 with Finetone Cassettes, a division of T-Series. Rajinder Singh of Finetone, who helped Dosanjh make a debut in the Punjabi music industry, suggested to him to spell his first name as Diljit instead of Daljit. The music was composed by Bablu Mahindra and the lyrics were written by Balvir Boparai. Dosanjh gave vocals to all the eight tracks and the producers made a music video for the title track of the album. In 2004, his second album Dil was released, which was again with Finetone Cassettes.

2004–2010: More albums and singles

Dosanjh's popularity soared with the release of his third album, Smile, produced by Sukhpal Sukh, which included the tracks "Nachh Diyan Alran Kuwariyan" and "Paggan Pochviyan Wale." The album was released by Finetone Cassettes in 2005. His next album Ishq Ho Gaya was released in 2006 by Finetone Cassettes. His fifth album, titled Chocolate, came out in 2008. In 2009, Dosanjh released four different singles – "Bhagat Singh," "No Tension," "Power of Duets" and "Dance with Me." Next year, Dosanjh released his sixth album called The Next Level with nine tracks. Dosanjh gave his next song in 2010 for Mel Karade Rabba: Original Soundtrack. The track was lip-synced by the actor Jimmy Shergill and was included in the feature film of the same name during opening credits.

2011–2012: Entry into Punjabi films and Lak 28 Kudi Da

2011 saw Dosanjh's entry into mainstream Punjabi films. His debut film in the lead role The Lion of Punjab, was released in February 2011. Though the film flopped at the box office, his track "Lak 28 Kudi Da," from the films's soundtrack, was a major success. The track, featuring Yo Yo Honey Singh, reached number 1 on The Official Asian Download Chart in USA published by the BBC. In July 2011, his second Punjabi film Jihne Mera Dil Luteya was released. The film, also featuring Gippy Grewal and Neeru Bajwa, did good business. Dosanjh gave vocals to six of the twelve tracks in the film's soundtrack. In November the same year, Diljit announced that he won't release his controversial album Urban Pendu, that included the single "15 Saal." That single, featuring Yo Yo Honey Singh, talked about the promiscuous behaviour of underage girls and their indulgence in alcohol, drugs and tattoos. He wrote on his Facebook page: "It was not my intention to hurt anyone's sentiments. I apologize to my fans who were waiting for this song." Dosanjh wore a T-shirt with the words "Urban Pendu" printed on it in the music video of his 2013 hit single Proper Patola as a remembrance of that track and album. Dosanjh also released three different singles in 2011 – "Catty Eyes," "Dharti" and "Chustiyan."

2012–present: Breakthrough and Bollywood career

Dosanjh continued his collaboration with Honey Singh in 2012 and released a single titled "Goliyan" that formed a part of the album International Villager. He next sang for the soundtrack of the Bollywood film Tere Naal Love Ho Gaya, released in January 2012, in a single called "Pee Pa Pee Pa" that also featured Priya Panchal. He also acted in that music video in the film. His subsequent single "Bodyguard", glorified the fall of Libyan revolutionary and politician, Muammar Gaddafi, where Dosanjh sang about his lifestyle, capture and death. His subsequent single "Miss Lonely", was composed by JSL Singh. In March 2012, he released his first religious album titled Sikh. The album featured eight singles and talked about the principles and philosophy of Sikh religion. Dosanjh played a lead role in June 2012 film Jatt & Juliet, which became one of the biggest hits in the Punjabi film industry. The award-winning film, directed by Anurag Singh, also featured actress Neeru Bajwa and was shot in Punjab and Mumbai in India and Vancouver, British Columbia, Canada. Dosanjh Diljit won the PTC Punjabi Film Award for Best Actor for the film. He gave vocals to five of the seven songs in the soundtrack of the film. The same year in November, he released his eighth album, called Back 2 Basics, with nine tracks and the music composed by Tru Skool. The duo worked together to produce the incredibly popular "Kharku" which won the "Best Bhangra Song of the Year" award at both the Brit Asia TV Music Awards, and the PTC Punjabi Music Awards. In January 2013, Dosanjh's third Punjabi film Saadi Love Story hit the big screens. The film, that also starred Amrinder Gill and Surveen Chawla, flopped at the box office. Dosanjh sang for two songs in the film's soundtrack, which was composed by Jaidev Kumar. Dosanjh made a guest appearance in the April 2013 Bollywood film Bikkar Bai Sentimental with his track "Main Fan Bhagat Singh Da". Inspired by the success of Jatt & Juliet, the producers of the film released a sequel to the film, titled Jatt & Juliet 2, in June 2013. Dosanjh played the role of a cop in the film. The film had nine songs in the soundtrack, of which four were sung by Dosanjh. He gave vocals for the track "Main Taan Aidaan Hi Nachna" from the soundtrack of the Bollywood film Yamla Pagla Deewana 2, which was released in June 2013. In August 2013, Dosanjh's music video "Proper Patola" was released on Vevo, making it the first Punjabi song to be featured on Vevo. The single, composed by Badshah, received over one million hits on YouTube just within a fortnight of its release. Dosanjh said: "I extend my thanks to all who have liked watching the song. I'm glad to live up to the expectations of all, and with their faith in me." Diljit shot for his next Punjabi film Disco Singh, which was released on 11 April 2014. The film, directed and written by Anurag Singh, also features Surveen Chawla and is shot in Delhi NCR. In 2014, he worked for the film Punjab 1984, which is set in the backdrop of 1984–86 Punjab insurgency. The film was released on 27 June 2014 and is directed by Anurag Singh. The film won National Film Award for Best Feature Film in Punjabi. Diljit is only the first south Asian artist who visited the US headquarters of Google, Facebook, Twitter, YouTube and Instagram on the same day. In 2015, he sang in a duet song in Coke Studio @ MTV Season 4, Ki Banu Duniya Da, with the singer Gurdas Maan which was released on 15 August 2015 and was broadcast on 16 August 2015 on MTV India. Diljit's second film from 2015 Mukhtiar Chadha was appreciated for his unique role in it. In 2015, the Most Sensational Celebrities (MSC) study among most famous people in Pollywood, the riskiest personalities on the web, Diljit Dosanjh was found number one from number five in 2014 thus leaving behind Mika Singh, Gippy Grewal and Harbhajan Mann.

Dosanjh next starred in the social drama Udta Punjab (2016), his first Hindi film. With a worldwide collection of 996.7 million, the film proved to be a commercial success. Directed by Abhishek Chaubey, the film deals with the subject of substance abuse in the Indian province of Punjab. Co-starring alongside Kareena Kapoor, Shahid Kapoor and Alia Bhatt, Udta Punjab generated controversy when the Central Board of Film Certification deemed that the film represented Punjab in a negative light and demanded extensive censorship before its theatrical release. The Bombay High Court later cleared the film for exhibition with one scene cut. Dosanjh also sang the song "Ik Kudi" for the film. In a highly positive review, The Hindu said that Dosanjh was "successful" in delivering a "highly hitting performance".

As of September 2016, Dosanjh has completed work on his second Bollywood production Phillauri, alongside Anushka Sharma and Suraj Sharma. The film was released on 23 March 2017. It grossed over ₹5 million in its box-office. In 2018, a film based on World War I, titled Sajjan Singh Rangroot was released in which Dosanjh played the titular character. He is the first turbaned Sikh to be honoured with a wax statue at Madame Tussauds. In 2019, he acted in Good Newwz, alongside Akshay Kumar, Kareena Kapoor and Kiara Advani.

In 2020, he appeared in social satire Suraj Pe Mangal Bhari alongside Manoj Bajpayee and Fatima Sana Shaikh. The film was released theatrically on 13 November 2020. In the same year, Dosanjh sang a spiritual song - "Paigambar".

In 2020, Dosanjh entered Social 50 chart by Billboard, following the release of his 11th album G.O.A.T. The album later rose to the top of Billboards Top Triller Global chart. Also, the album entered top 20 in Canadian Albums Chart.

In 2021, Dosanjh released his twelfth album "Moonchild Era", it was penned by Raj Ranjodh and Arjan Dhillon. Album charted at #32 on Billboard Canadian Albums Chart making him the first Indian Artist to have his three albums on Billboard Charts. In 2021, he made it to the Sikh 100 list.

In 2021, he released his debut film as producer Honsla Rakh starring Sonam Bajwa, Shehnaaz Gill, Shinda Grewal alongside him. The film made 5.05 crore on its opening day making it the highest grossing punjabi film on openings day. He signed with Warner Music in March 2022.

Artistry

Musical style and influences

Continually experimenting with new musical ideas and images, Dosanjh's musical and performance style is the subject of analysis and scrutiny from critics. Dosanjh grew up learning music from Gobinder Singh Alampuri and Kartar Singh, and his initial work reflected their style. His later collaboration with Honey Singh lent a different dimension to his music. The composers Jaidev Kumar, Sukhpal Sukh, Sachin Ahuja, Pavneet Birgi, Jassi Bros Bhinda Aujla, and Tru Skool have all influenced him. His goal is to make a Punjabi song that becomes worldwide hit like Korean single Gangnam Style.

Videos, films and stage
His live performances are described as highly entertaining and innovative. For his music videos, he has worked with a wide range of directors such as Rimpy Prince, Sukh Sanghera, Amarjit Satwant, Parmod Sharma Rana and Azeem I Parkar. He has been best appreciated for comic roles in films. In March 2016, Diljit stated that his dream role is a pirate similar to Captain Jack Sparrow as played by Johnny Depp in Pirates of the Caribbean series. He regularly tours in Canada/USA and, since 2014, in the United Kingdom. His 2016 "The Dosanjh Tour" led to sold-out concerts throughout the UK. As a result, he became the second Punjabi artist after Gurdas Mann who sold out Wembley Arena.

In the media
Dosanjh was ranked in The Times Most Desriable Men at No. 9 in 2016, at No. 13 in 2017, at No. 20 in 2018, at No. 16 in 2019, at No. 14 in 2020.

He was ranked in the Chandigarh Times Most Desirable Men at No. 2 in 2018, at No. 1 in 2019, at No. 2 in 2020.

In August 2020, he became the first Punjabi artist to get featured at the Times Square in New York City.

Brand endorsements
Diljit Dosanjh is associated with Coca-Cola. In August 2015, Coca-Cola Signed Diljit Dosanjh as Brand Endorser for Punjab, India. Flipkart, India's leading e-commerce company roped Diljit Dosanjh for its Flipkart Connect campaign for Punjab. Diljit was appointed the brand ambassador of Season 4 of the Star Sports Pro Kabbadi along with Rana Daggubati and Puneeth Rajkumar. He sang and performed the Pro Kabbadi League theme song "Asli Panga", produced by Yo Yo Honey.

Philanthropy
Dosanjh started an NGO called Saanjh Foundation focusing on underprivileged children and seniors, contributing to orphanages and old age homes. It also endeavours youth empowerment with issues like self-confidence, well-being, anti-bullying, mentoring, and career development. It takes its name from the second part of Dosanjh's last name, which loosely translated means "amity". He launched this organisation on his birthday in 2013.

Discography

 DIL (2002)
 Ishq Da Uda Aada (2002)
 Haysha (2004)
 Smile Over Exposure (2005)
 Ishq Ho Gaya (2008)
 Chocolate (2008)
 The Next Level (2009)
 Sikh (2012)
 Back 2 Basics (2012)
 CON.FI.DEN.TIAL (2018)
 Roar (2018)
 G.O.A.T. (2020)
 MoonChild Era (2021)

 Filmography 
FilmsPunjabi filmsHindi films'

Television

Awards and nominations

References

External links

 

Punjabi-language singers
Male actors in Punjabi cinema
Living people
21st-century Indian male actors
Indian Sikhs
Male actors from Punjab, India
Indian male voice actors
Punjabi music
Bhangra (music) musicians
Indian folk-pop singers
Male actors in Hindi cinema
1984 births
Filmfare Awards winners
International Indian Film Academy Awards winners
Zee Cine Awards winners
Singers from Punjab, India
People from Jalandhar district
21st-century Indian singers